Phenadoxone (trade names Heptalgin, Morphidone, and Heptazone) is an opioid analgesic of the open chain class (methadone and relatives) invented in Germany by Hoechst in 1947. It is one of a handful of useful synthetic analgesics which were used in the United States for various lengths of time in the 20 or so years after the end of the Second World War but which were withdrawn from the market for various or no known reason and which now are mostly in Schedule I of the United States' Controlled Substances Act of 1970, or (like phenazocine and bezitramide) in Schedule II but not produced or marketed in the US.  Others on this list are ketobemidone (Ketogin), dextromoramide (Dimorlin, Palfium and others), phenazocine (Narphen and Prinadol), dipipanone (Diconal, Pipadone and Wellconal), piminodine (Alvodine), propiram (Algeril), anileridine (Leritine) and alphaprodine (Nisentil).

Phenadoxone has a US DEA ACSCN of 9637 and recently has had a zero annual manufacturing quota under the Controlled Substances Act 1970.  Its withdrawal from US distribution prior to the promulgation of said act is a large part of its Schedule I designation; it is, however, used as a legitimate medication in other countries and consumption is increasing worldwide as indicated below.

Phenadoxone is generally considered to be a strong opioid analgesic and is regulated in much the same way as morphine where it is used. The usual starting dose is 10–20 mg and it has a duration of analgesic effect of 1 to 4 hours.  Phenadoxone is not used at this time for purposes other than pain relief.

Worldwide consumption of phenadoxone has actually increased slightly in recent years according to a recent report from the World Health Organization. Like its drug subcategory prototype methadone, phenadoxone can be used as the opioid analgesic in Brompton cocktail.  Phenadoxone is most used at the current time in Denmark and various countries in eastern Europe.

References

4-Morpholinyl compunds
Ketones
Mu-opioid receptor agonists
Synthetic opioids
Benzhydryl compounds